Blue Skies is a 1929 American drama film directed by Alfred L. Werker and starring Carmencita Johnson, Freddie Burke Frederick, and Ethel Wales. The film is based on a short story called The Matron's Report by Frederick Hazlitt Brennan. The short story also formed the basis for 1936's Little Miss Nobody.

Cast
 Carmencita Johnson as Dorothy May
 Freddie Burke Frederick as Richard Lewis  
 Ethel Wales as Matron  
 Helen Twelvetrees as Dorothy May  
 Frank Albertson as Richard Lewis  
 Rosa Gore as Nellie Crouch 
 William Orlamond as Janitor  
 E.H. Calvert as Mr. Semple Jones  
 Evelyn Hall as Mrs. Semple Jones  
 Claude King as Richard Danforth  
 Adele Watson as First Assistant Matron  
 Helen Jerome Eddy as Second Assistant Matron 
 Mickey Martin 
 Dickie Moore 
 Coy Watson 
 Delmar Watson 
 Harry Watson 
 Virginia Bruce as Party Guest 
 John Darrow as Dorothy's Beau / Party Guest

References

Bibliography
 Goble, Alan. The Complete Index to Literary Sources in Film. Walter de Gruyter, 1999.

External links
 
 

1929 films
1929 drama films
1920s English-language films
Films directed by Alfred L. Werker
Fox Film films
American black-and-white films
1920s American films
American drama films